Lund Airport  was an airfield located  south of Lund, Sweden. It was established in 1964 for private aircraft only. The airport also served as the helicopter landing area for Lund University Hospital. Before it was closed, in the 2000s, it mainly served as the home of the local flying club and other enthusiasts. The airfield closed in 2008 when the property was converted for industrial development.

References 

Airports in Skåne County
Transport in Lund